Patriarch Pavle and Patriarch Pavle I may refer to:

 Pavle of Smederevo, Archbishop of Peć and self-proclaimed Serbian Patriarch c. 1527 – 1541
 Pavle, Serbian Patriarch, Archbishop of Peć and Serbian Patriarch from 1990 to 2009

See also
Pavle (disambiguation)
Archbishop Pavle (disambiguation)
List of heads of the Serbian Orthodox Church